Ali Mohammad Beygi (also Romanized as ‘Alī Moḩammad Beygī and ‘Alī Moḩammad Bekī) is a village in Koregah-e Gharbi Rural District, in the Central District of Khorramabad County, Lorestan Province, Iran. At the 2006 census, its population was 88, in 16 families.

References 

Towns and villages in Khorramabad County